Arttu Ruotsalainen (born 29 October 1997) is a Finnish professional ice hockey forward for EHC Kloten of the National League (NL).

Playing career
Ruotsalainen first played as a youth within hometown club, Oulun Kärpät. As a 14-year old he played at the Under 16 level in 2011–12, edging out team-mate and future NHL'er Sebastian Aho, to lead the team in scoring with 24 goals and 59 points. He shared fourth place in the C Junior Championship with Alex Olkinuora of Tappara.

In the following 2012–13 season, Ruotsalainen played the majority of the year at the Under 18 level, returning to strengthen the under 16 team for the post-season where he won the C Youth Championship series in the spring of 2013 with 27 points in just 11 games. Ruotsalainen continued his ascension up the junior levels playing the majority of the 2013–14 season at the under 20, Junior A Championship.

Showing early offensive potential, Ruotsalainen was selected 47th overall at the 2014 KHL Entry Draft by Metallurg Novokuznetsk. He continued to play at the Junior A level in the 2014–15 season. At the conclusion of the year, he secured his first professional Liiga contract, agreeing to an optional three-year contract with Ässät on 17 June 2015.

In the 2015–16 season, Ruotsalainen made his Liiga debut in the opening round on 11 September 2015, against rival club Lukko. He went scoreless in 9 minutes of ice time. He later registered his first professional goal in a 3-1 defeat to the Espoo Blues on 24 November 2015. By seasons' end, he totalled 5 goals and 10 points in 51 regular season games. He split the year continuing to play at the under 20 level, registering 32 points in just 18 games, to lead the league in points-per-game with 1.78.

In the 2016–17 season, Ruotsalainen played in a reduced role with Ässät, he posted just 1 goal in 34 games, with a solitary appearance in the post-season.

In order to continue his development, Ruotsalainen left Ässät to sign a one-year contract with fellow Liiga club, Ilves Tampere on 7 April 2017. In the 2017–18 season, he blossomed by his change of scenery producing 9 goals and  20 points in 60 Liiga games. During the campaign he was signed to an improved two-year deal before again extending his tenure with Ilves on another two-year contract in the early stages of the 2018–19 season to remain contracted through 2022.

In his second season with Ilves, Ruotsalainen accelerated his development in the Liiga, leading the club in scoring with 21 goals and 42 points at the center position, finishing 9th in League scoring. During the season he scored his first career hat-trick, notching the feat in a 6-5 victory over HIFK on 23 January 2019. In the playoffs, Ruotsalainen continued to lead Ilves with 7 points in as many games.

Undrafted, Ruotsalainen gained the interest of the NHL, using an out-clause in his contract with Ilves to sign a three-year, entry-level contract with the Buffalo Sabres on 8 March 2019. He made his NHL debut with the team on 9 April, in a game against the Washington Capitals. Ruotsalainen scored his first career NHL goal on 11 April in a 5–3 victory against the Philadelphia Flyers.

As a restricted free agent from the Sabres following the  season, Ruotsalainen opted to return to Europe by agreeing to a one-year contract with Swiss champions, EHC Kloten of the NL, on 22 July 2022.

International play

Ruotsalainen played at the junior level for Finland at the 2017 World Junior Championships and the 2015 U18 World Championships, where he won silver in Switzerland. He also featured at the under 18 Ivan Hlinka Memorial Tournament in 2014, where he was the captain of Finland.

Ruotsalainen was called into the Finnish national team, added to the roster in the Karjala Tournament on 8 November 2018 at the Hartwall Arena in Helsinki against Russia. While he did not end up with ice time, he made his debut in the next game on 10 November 2018 against the Czech Republic. Ruotsalainen was among the last cuts from the national team for the 2019 World Championships.

Career statistics

Regular season and playoffs

International

References

External links
 

1997 births
Living people
Ässät players
Buffalo Sabres players
Finnish ice hockey forwards
Ilves players
EHC Kloten players
Rochester Americans players
Sportspeople from Oulu
Undrafted National Hockey League players